101 Reykjavík is a 2000 Icelandic romantic comedy film directed by Baltasar Kormákur and starring Victoria Abril and Hilmir Snær Guðnason. It is based on the 1996 novel of the same name by Hallgrímur Helgason, and both are set in Reykjavík, Iceland. The title is taken from the postal code for the Miðborg district of central Reykjavík, the postal code being a common way to refer to the area. The film won nine B-class film awards and received ten nominations most notably winning the Discovery Film Award at the Toronto International Film Festival.

The film centers on Hlynur, a twentysomething slacker who still lives with his mother, Berglind. His mother’s Spanish flamenco teacher, Lola, moves in with the two for Christmas. While his mother is away, Hlynur learns Lola is a lesbian. After a night of drinking, Hlynur and Lola end up having sex. When Berglind returns home, she discloses to Hlynur that she is also a lesbian and she is in love with Lola.

Cast 

Victoria Abril as Lola
Hilmir Snær Guðnason as Hlynur
Hanna María Karlsdóttir as Berglind
Þrúður Vilhjálmsdóttir as Hófí
Baltasar Kormákur as Þröstur
Ólafur Darri Ólafsson as Marri
Þröstur Leó Gunnarsson as Brúsi
Eyvindur Erlendsson as Hafsteinn
Halldóra Björnsdóttir as Elsa
Hilmar Jonsson as Magnús
Jóhann Sigurðarson as Páll
Edda Heiðrún Backman as Páll's wife
Guðmundur Ingi Þorvaldsson as Ellert
Gunnar Eyjólfsson as the neighbor
Jónína Ólafsdóttir as woman at the employment office
Sigríður Helgadóttir as Amma
Inga Maria Valdimarsdóttir as Vinkona Hófíar
Agnar Jón Egilsson as Rósi
Rósi Hattari as Barfluga
Atli Rafn Sigurðsson as Gulli
Guðrún María Bjarnadóttir as Ingey
Lilja Nótt Þórarinsdóttir as Gunna
Benedikt Ingi Armannsson as Óli

Awards and nominations

Awards
Toronto International Film Festival (2000)
Discovery Award - Baltasar Kormákur
Thessaloniki Film Festival (2000)
FIPRESCI Prize - Parallel Sections: Baltasar Kormákur
Lübeck Nordic Film Days (2000)
Prize of the Ecumenical Jury - Baltasar Kormákur
Locarno International Film Festival (2000)
Youth Jury Award - Baltasar Kormákur
Iceland Edda Awards (2000)
Edda Award - Professional Category: Screenwriting: Baltasar Kormákur
Edda Award - Professional Category: Sound: Kjartan Kjartansson
Pula Film Festival (2001)
Big Golden Arena Award - Best Film: Baltasar Kormákur
Tbilisi International Film Festival (2001)
Prize of the Union of Georgian Filmmakers - Baltasar Kormákur

Nominations
Locarno Festival (2000)
Golden Leopard Award - Baltasar Kormákur
European Film Award (2000)
European Discovery of the Year - Baltasar Kormákur
Iceland Edda Awards (2000)
Edda Award - Actor of the Year: Hilmir Snær Guðnason
Edda Award - Actress of the Year: Hanna María Karlsdóttir
Edda Award - Actress of the Year: Victoria Abril
Edda Award - Best Film
Edda Award - Director of the Year: Baltasar Kormákur
Camerimage (2000)
Golden Frog Award - Peter Steuger
Bogotá Film Festival (2001)
Golden Precolumbian Circle Award - Best Film: Baltasar Kormákur
Buenos Aires International Festival of Independent Cinema (2001)
Best Film Award - Baltasar Kormákur

References

External links

 
 
 
 

2000 films
Icelandic LGBT-related films
Icelandic romantic comedy films
Lesbian-related films
2000 romantic comedy films
2000s Icelandic-language films
English-language Icelandic films
2000s English-language films
Films based on Icelandic novels
Films set in Reykjavík
Films directed by Baltasar Kormákur
Films about dysfunctional families
2000 directorial debut films
2000 independent films
LGBT-related romantic comedy films
2000 LGBT-related films
2000 multilingual films
Icelandic multilingual films